Velleda murina is a species of beetle in the family Cerambycidae. It was described by James Thomson in 1858. It is known from the Republic of the Congo, Equatorial Guinea, and Gabon.

References

Phrissomini
Beetles described in 1858